Academy of Public Administration or National Academy of Public Administration may refer to:
Academy of Public Administration (Belarus)
Academy of Public Administration (Azerbaijan)
Lal Bahadur Shastri National Academy of Administration, India
National Academy of Public Administration (United States)
National Academy of Public Administration (Vietnam)
North-West Academy of Public Administration, Russia
Russian Presidential Academy of National Economy and Public Administration

See also
Institute of Public Administration (disambiguation)